Emma Parker (born 24 April 1999) is an English snooker player. She made her tournament debut at the 2015 Eden Masters, aged 15, and was number one in the women's under-21 world rankings as of April 2019. Her highest position in the senior rankings is sixth. She has reached three ranking semi-finals on the World Women's Snooker Tour.

Career
Parker started playing pool at the age of four, and turned to snooker at the age of 15 after her father and uncle took her to Romford Snooker Club. In April 2017, she won the Under-21 Ladies World Championship at the Northern Snooker Center in Leeds. Following further success, she rose to 8th in the women's world rankings in September 2019.

She and fellow tour player Reanne Evans were the two women among the eight wildcards for the 128-player televised 2019 Snooker Shoot-Out, making them the first women to compete in the final stages of a televised world ranking event. Shoot Out matches are one  and have a maximum duration of 10 minutes, with limited time allowed for each shot. Parker lost 17–61 to Laxman Rawat.

Parker won the 2020 Belgian Women's Open (Under-21) event, beating Albina Hashcuk 2–0 in the final. She also reached the semi-finals of the main 2020 Belgian Women's Open event, where she lost 0–4 to Reanne Evans. Following this, Parker reached 7th in the women's snooker rankings, a new career best for her.

Personal life
Parker lives in Hornchurch, and is coached by Gary Filtness. She works full-time for an accountancy company in Hornchurch.

Performance timeline
World Women's Snooker

Titles and achievements

Notes

References

External links
Profile at World Women's Snooker

English snooker players
1999 births
Living people
Female snooker players
People from Hornchurch